Anurodh (English: Request) is a 1977 Hindi musical drama film, based on the 1963 Bengali film Deya Neya, produced by Girija Samanta and directed by Shakti Samanta. 

The film stars Rajesh Khanna,  Vinod Mehra, Simple Kapadia who made her debut, Rita Bhaduri, Ashok Kumar, Asrani, Asit Sen Utpal Dutt and Nirupa Roy. The music of the film is by Laxmikant Pyarelal. The movie revolves around a rich city boy (played by Khanna), who aspires to be a musician against his father's wishes and assumes a different identity to sing for a radio station, while his songs are written by a poor friend (played by Mehra)
 
Pyarelal quoted in an interview "Rajesh Khanna had great interest in music and a terrific sense of melody too. His music is dominated by Pancham (R.D. Burman) and we accepted Shakti Samanta's Anurodh only because Rajesh Khanna had some misunderstanding with Pancham then and did not want to work with him." Director Shakti Samanta said that although the film had an "interesting story", he felt that audiences didn't want to accept the leading man, Rajesh Khanna, doing romantic scenes with his real-life wife Dimple Kapadia's sister Simple Kapadia and this is the reason this film was just a superhit otherwise it would have been a bigger blockbuster. The movie ran to silver jubilee on its release.

Plot
Arun was the only son of a rich businessman Mr. Chaudhury. He was an upcoming singer, sings in local radio, mostly the songs written by his friend Srikant. His father wants him to look after their family business and thinks singing is not the kind of job for people of their status. This always leads to friction between father and son. On the other end, Srikant leads a very poor lifestyle along with his widowed mother. He earns a living by writing songs and articles. Arun frequently helps them with money as Srikant becomes chronically ill and couldn't work outside.

While things are like this, one day Arun fights with his father and decides to leave his house for Calcutta (presently Kolkata). He joins as a singer there in local radio and works as a driver in the house of Mr. Mathur. He uses name Sanjay Kumar to hide his identity. Mathur lives along with his grandchild Sunita. He lost his son in a war and can't find the whereabouts of his daughter-in-law and grandson for which he continuously organizes searches. Arun grows close with Sunita, headstrong granddaughter of Mathur. Sunita admires Sanjay Kumar without knowing that he and Arun are one and the same. Mathur learns that Arun was the escaped son of his friend Chaudhury and informs him regarding Arun's whereabouts.

Meanwhile, Srikant becomes critically ill and doctors diagnose it as end stage tuberculosis. His mother comes to Calcutta along with him. Arun gets shocked to see Srikant like that and swears to save him anyway. He decides to organize a stage show though he decides not to do it till the last minute. He sings on a stage and earns enough money for the operation. The surgeon recognizes Srikant's mother as the lost daughter-in-law of Mathur and informs him. Srikant's operation becomes a success and he gets reunited with his grandfather. Arun's parents come to Calcutta to see how their son became famous and his father changes his opinions regarding singing. At the end, everyone reconciles and Sunita and Arun marry.

Cast
 Rajesh Khanna as Arun Choudhury / Sanjay Kumar / Pritam Nath Ghayal
 Simple Kapadia as Sunita Mathur
 Ashok Kumar as Mr. Mathur
 Vinod Mehra as Shrikanth Mathur
 Nirupa Roy as Radha Mathur
 Utpal Dutt as R.K. Choudhary
 Dina Pathak as Sushma Choudhary
 Rita Bhaduri as Anju
 Preeti Ganguly as Manjeet
 Asrani as Bhishan Singh
  Asit Sen as Saxena (Radio Station Manager)
 Jankidas as Mr.Sharma
 Raj Kishore as Mahir Lucknowi
 Amol Sen as Pooran singh
 Birbal as Veera 
 Mrinal Mukherjee as Anand Mathur
 Abhi Bhattacharya as Dr.Sen
 Subroto Mahapatra as Bholuram, Sunita's driver
 Amar Nath as Guptaji

Soundtrack
All lyrics  are given  by Anand Bakshi and composed by Laxmikant Pyarelal

Kishore Kumar got nominated for the song "Aapke Anurodh Pe" at filmfare awards but lost to Mohammad Rafi.

Reception
It received five out of five in the Bollywood guide Collections. The film grossed 6 crores at the box office in 1977. Music became super hit, especially the song 'Aapke anurodh pe' sung by Kishore Kumar. 'Aate Jaate khoobsurat, awaara sadkon pe' was another blockbuster song sung by Kishore Kumar.

Kishor Kumar was nominated for Filmfare award for the song 'Aap ke anurodh' and Vinod Mehra for best supporting actor.

References

External links 
 

1977 films
Indian buddy films
Indian romantic drama films
1970s Hindi-language films
Films directed by Shakti Samanta
Films scored by Laxmikant–Pyarelal